Frappato di Vittoria or Frappato is a red Italian wine grape variety planted primarily in Sicily. As a varietal, Frappato produces light bodied wines with a distinct grapey aroma. It is most commonly seen as a component of Sicily's only DOCG wine, Cerasuolo di Vittoria, which consists of 30-50% Frappato and 50-70% Nero d'Avola.

An Italian study published in 2008 using DNA typing showed a close genetic relationship between Sangiovese on the one hand and ten other Italian grape varieties on the other hand, including Frappato. It is therefore likely that Frappato is a crossing of Sangiovese and another, so far unidentified, grape variety.

Synonyms
Frappato di Vittoria is also known under the synonyms Frappato, Frappato Nero, Frappato Nero di Vittoria, Frappatu, Frappatu di Vittoria, Nerello, Nerello di Catania, and Nero Capitano.

References

Red wine grape varieties